4×4 FOUR BY FOUR is the eighth album and sixth studio album by Casiopea recorded and released in 1982. Lee Ritenour, Harvey Mason, Nathan East, and Don Grusin participated in the recording of this album.

Lee Ritenour, Harvey Mason and Nathan East, along with pianist Bob James, rather than Don Grusin, went on to become the Original members of Fourplay in 1991.

Track listing

Personnel
Issei Noro – Electric guitar (YAMAHA SG-2000, SG-1000 Fretless), Acoustic guitar (on B2), Percussion (on A2, A3, B3)
Lee Ritenour – Electric guitar (Ibanez, Fender Stratocaster, Ovation Nylon Strings), Classical guitar (on A2), Acoustic Guitar (on B2)

Minoru Mukaiya – Keyboards (YAMAHA GS-1, CS-70M, CP-35, Oberheim OB-Xa, Moog the SOURCE)
Don Grusin – Keyboards (Acoustic Piano (on A2), YAMAHA CP-80 (on A1, B1), Oberheim OB-Xa (on A2, B2), Rhodes (on A3, B3))

Tetsuo Sakurai – Electric Bass (YAMAHA BB-2000 Milk Bass) (on A2、B1、B3), Percussion (on B3)
Nathan East – Electric Bass (YAMAHA BB-2000, Roland GR-33B) (on A1、A3、B1、B2)

Akira Jimbo – drums (YAMAHA YD-9000R) (except on B3), Percussion (on A3, B2, B3)
Harvey Mason – drums (Premier Sound Wave Custom) (on A1、B1、B3), Marimba (on A2、B2)

Production
 Producer – Shunsuke Miyazumi
Associate Producer – Satoshi Nakao
 Recording and Mixing Engineer – Norio Yoshizawa
Assistant Engineer – Atsushi Saito, Shinji Miyoshi
Mastering Engineer – Osamu Shimoju
Mixed – Norio Yoshizawa, Issei Noro
Art Direction and Design – Nao Magami, Shinya "SHAR" Asami
 Illustration - Shinya "SHAR" Asami
Remastering engineer - Kouji Suzuki (2016)

Release history

External links

References

1982 albums
Casiopea albums
Alfa Records albums